Sam the Man is a 2001 American film directed by Gary Winick and starring Fisher Stevens.

Plot
A writer having difficulty completing his second novel goes on a journey of self-discovery.

Cast

Fisher Stevens	as Sam Manning
Annabella Sciorra as Cass
Alex Porter as Saxophone Player
John Slattery as Maxwell Slade
Annika Peterson as Emily
Ron Rifkin	as Richard
Saverio Guerra	as Lorenzo Pugano
George Plimpton as himself
Griffin Dunne as man in Bathroom
Maria Bello as Anastasia Powell
Danielle Ferland as Ella
Joshua Dov	as College Boy (as Josh Dov)
Rob Morrow	as Daniel Lenz
Luis Guzmán as Murray (as Luis Guzman)
Jean-Luke Figueroa	as Buster Pugano

External links

2001 films
2001 independent films
2001 romantic comedy-drama films
2000s English-language films
American independent films
American romantic comedy-drama films
Films about infidelity
Films about writers
Films directed by Gary Winick
Films set in New York City
Films shot in New York City
2000s American films